Ali Lateef (born 18 January 1996 in Iraq) is an Iraqi footballer who plays as a defender for Al-Minaa in Iraq Premier League.

International career
On 24 July 2016, Ali Lateef made his first international cap with Iraq against Uzbekistan in a friendly match.

Honours

Club
Al-Zawraa
 Iraqi Premier League: 2015–16

References

External links
 

1996 births
Living people
Association football midfielders
Iraqi footballers
Iraq international footballers
Al-Zawraa SC players
Al-Shorta SC players
Al-Mina'a SC players
Place of birth missing (living people)